Netherbeast Incorporated is a 2007 American comedy horror film directed by Dean Ronalds, written by Bruce Dellis, and starring Darrell Hammond and Steve Burns. It is an undead office comedy concerning a telephone company in the U.S. state of Arizona staffed entirely by flesh-eating, vampire-like employees who refer to themselves as "Netherfolk". Historical figures such as President James Garfield and Alexander Graham Bell are woven into the story. The film premiered at the 2007 AFI/Dallas Film Festival.

Cast

See also
 Bloodsucking Bastards, a 2015 horror film with similar elements

References

External links
 
 

2007 films
American comedy horror films
American independent films
Films set in Arizona
Workplace comedies
Cultural depictions of Alexander Graham Bell
Cultural depictions of James A. Garfield
Cultural depictions of presidents of the United States
2000s comedy horror films
2007 comedy films
2000s English-language films
2000s American films